Richard Williams  was a Welsh landowner and politician who sat in the House of Commons from 1621 to 1622.

Williams was the elder son of William ap Shon ap John ap Gruffydd of Rhosygeido. He was admitted a member of Gray's Inn on  6 February 1593. In 1617, he was High Sheriff of Anglesey.  He was of Llys Dulas and Rhosygeido
In 1621, he was elected Member of Parliament for Anglesey.
 
Williams married firstly Marsby Lloyd heiress of Llys Dulas. He married secondly Elin Wynn daughter of John 
Wynn, (son of Owen Wynn of Gaer Milwr). His third wife was Margaret Meredith widow of Owen Meredith M.D, and daughter of Owen Holland of Berw.

References

Year of birth missing
Year of death missing
Members of the Parliament of England (pre-1707) for constituencies in Wales
English MPs 1621–1622
High Sheriffs of Anglesey
Members of Gray's Inn
17th-century Welsh politicians